The red forest skink (Scincella assata)  is a species of skink found in Mexico, Guatemala, El Salvador, Nicaragua, and Honduras.

References

Scincella
Reptiles described in 1864
Taxa named by Edward Drinker Cope
Reptiles of Central America